Abdul Hafeez Lakho (1928–2017), was a Pakistani lawyer and defence lawyer of former prime minister Zulfikar Ali Bhutto. He died at the age of 87.

He briefly served as a pilot in Pakistan Air Force but later resigned to pursue a career as a lawyer. He was a political activist and supporter of Zulfikar Ali Bhutto. He was awarded the highest civilian award of Sitara-e-Imtiaz in recognition of his services for the protection of human rights in the 1990s.

Award
Sitara-e-Imtiaz, for protection of human rights.

References

1930s births
2017 deaths
Pakistani lawyers
Sindhi people
Pakistan People's Party politicians
Pakistan Air Force officers
Pakistani aviators
Pakistani democracy activists
Pakistani human rights activists
Recipients of Sitara-i-Imtiaz
People from Karachi